Charles McLee Farris House is a historic home located at Augusta, St. Charles County, Missouri. It was built about 1850, and is a -story, three bay, frame dwelling on a stone foundation and with a saddlebag plan.  The house measures approximately 32 feet wide and 30 feet deep.  It has a side gable roof with dormer and one-bay front porch.

It was added to the National Register of Historic Places in 1995.

References

Houses on the National Register of Historic Places in Missouri
Houses completed in 1850
Buildings and structures in St. Charles County, Missouri
National Register of Historic Places in St. Charles County, Missouri